Feeble may refer to:

 Feeble-minded
 Feeble, one of the imaginary anthropomorphic characters of the 1989 film Meet the Feebles
 Feeble, Travis Barker's first punk band
 Feeble grind, a type of skateboarding trick

See also